The 2017 Hokkaido Bank Curling Classic was held August 3–6, 2017 in Sapporo, Japan. It was the first men's event and second women's event of the 2017–18 season. The total purse for the event was ¥ 1,700,000.

In the men's event, Kim Soo-hyuk defeated Yusuke Morozumi 8–7 in an extra end to win the tournament. In the women's event, Satsuki Fujisawa topped Kim Min-ji 7–3 in the final.

Men

Teams
The teams are listed as follows:

Round-robin standings
Final round-robin standings

Round-robin results
All draw times are listed in Japan Standard Time (UTC+09:00).

Draw 1
Friday, August 4, 8:00 am

Draw 3
Friday, August 4, 3:00 pm

Draw 5
Saturday, August 5, 8:00 am

Playoffs
Source:

Semifinals
Saturday, August 5, 6:00 pm

Final
Sunday, August 6, 11:30 am

Bronze medal game
Sunday, August 6, 11:30 am

Fifth place game
Sunday, August 6, 11:30 am

Seventh place game
Saturday, August 5, 6:00 pm

Women

Teams
The teams are listed as follows:

Round-robin standings
Final round-robin standings

Round-robin results
All draw times are listed in Japan Standard Time (UTC+09:00).

Draw 2
Friday, August 4, 11:30 am

Draw 4
Friday, August 4, 6:30 pm

Draw 6
Saturday, August 5, 11:30 am

Playoffs
Source:

Semifinals
Sunday, August 6, 8:00 am

Final
Sunday, August 6, 3:00 pm

Bronze medal game
Sunday, August 6, 3:00 pm

Fifth place game
Sunday, August 6, 3:00 pm

Seventh place game
Sunday, August 6, 8:00 am

References

External links
Men's Event
Women's Event

2017 in Japanese sport
2017 in curling
International curling competitions hosted by Japan
Sport in Sapporo
August 2017 sports events in Asia